Mohammad Ali Mia is a Bangladeshi police officer and an Additional Inspector General of Police of Bangladesh Police. He is the chief of Criminal Investigation Department (CID). Earlier, he was the chief of Tourist Police. He was posted in different posts of Bangladesh Police. Among them, he served as police's special branch (SB) DIG, Additional DIG of Dhaka Range as well as SP of Habiganj and Manikganj districts.

Early life 
Mia is from Gopalganj District.

Career 
Mia joined Bangladesh Police as an assistant superintendent of police in 15 November 1995. During the 2001 to 2006, Bangladesh Nationalist Party government he was sidelined for being from Gopalganj, the heartland of Awami League. He served in the Criminal Investigation Department as an Additional Superintendent of Police. In 2007, he was stationed in a diplomatic mission of Bangladesh.

In 2008, Mia was the Deputy Commissioner of Traffic of Chittagong Metropolitan Police. He took actions against 1500 illegal tuktuks and praised the media for their reporting that brought attention to the issue. Mia served as the Superintendent of Police of Narsingdi District in 2013.

Mia served as the Superintendent of Police of Manikganj District in 2013.

In 2015, Mia was serving as the Additional DIG of Special Branch when he was transferred to Rajshahi Range Police.

Mia was made the chief of Criminal Investigation Department on 16 August 2022. He had been serving as the head of the Tourist Police after replacing Mahbubur Rahman. As CID chief, he talked about his intention to crack down on Hundi networks due to the volatile situation of the foreign currency exchange market in Bangladesh.

References 

Living people
Bangladeshi police officers
People from Gopalganj District, Bangladesh
Year of birth missing (living people)
Criminal Investigation Department (Bangladesh) officers